Access Slope is an ice slope between the north end of Lindstrom Ridge and Tether Rock in the Meteorite Hills, Darwin Mountains. The slope is at the west end of the Circle Icefall in Darwin Glacier and appears to be the only route through the icefall. Descriptively named by the Darwin Glacier Party of the Commonwealth Trans-Antarctic Expedition, 1956–58, which made the first descent of the glacier.

Ice slopes of Antarctica
Bodies of ice of Oates Land